The Zambian Permanent Representative in New York City is the official representative of the Government in Lusaka next the Headquarters of the United Nations.

List of representatives

References 

 
Zambia
United Nations New York City